Severin is the name of two villages in Croatia:

 Severin, Bjelovar-Bilogora County (HR-43274)
 Severin na Kupi in Primorje-Gorski Kotar County (HR-51329)